The Second Federal Republic of Mexico is the name given to the second attempt to reestablish federalist government in Mexico. The first effort being known as the First Mexican Republic which fell in 1835 and was followed by almost a decade of the Centralist Republic of Mexico. The Centralist Republic of Mexico finally fell on August 22, 1846, when interim president José Mariano Salas issued a decree restoring the 1824 constitution. Mexico's loss in the war with the United States during this time saw half of Mexican territory become part of the United States through the Treaty of Guadalupe Hidalgo signed on February, 1848. 

The period following the war was followed by an era of moderate, peaceful rule and President José Joaquín de Herrera was the first president to complete his term in 1852 since the inaugural holder Guadalupe Victoria did so in 1828. As the government continued to grapple with ever-present financial issues, the presidency of Mariano Arista was overthrown by Santa Anna in 1853 for what would prove to be his last dictatorship. Santa Anna in turn was overthrown by the Plan of Ayutla in 1855, inaugurating the era of La Reforma.

History

Fall of the Centralist Republic
The Mexican American War broke out on April, 1846 during the presidency of Mariano Paredes. 

In the first few months of the war, the Paredes administration was confronted with a catastrophic series of losses. U.S. forces under Zachary Taylor had crossed the Rio Grande, and undefeated through a series of battles made it as far south as Saltillo. Meanwhile American forces were in the process of successfully taking California. 

As the course of the war inflamed opposition against the government, and Paredes faced revolution, he resigned on July 28, choosing to return to the military to help with the war effort. Nicolas Bravo was meanwhile chosen as his successor 

On August 3, the garrisons of Vera Cruz and San Juan de Ulua revolted, against Bravo. Mariano Salas was made the provisional president, and on August 22, he restored the Constitution of 1824, putting an end to Centralist Republic of Mexico, and inaugurating the era of the Second Federalist Republic.

Mexican American War
Salas allowed the exiled Santa Anna to return to the nation, and the latter embraced the liberal Constitution of 1824. Salas now formed his cabinet out of liberals and Santa Anna supporters, including ex president Valentin Gomez Farias who now received the post of finance minister.  

Towards the end of August, a proposal for peace arrived from the American government through the intermediary of the governor of Veracruz. The American government advised President Salas to treat the annexation of Texas as an established irrevocable fact. Salas decided to stall, and replied that he could not deal with the matter until congress met.   

Congress finally opened its sessions on December 5, 1846, at midnight, composed mostly of liberals. General Salas opened the session by lamenting the defeats that the military had faced, but expressed hope for the army of twenty thousand men that Santa Anna had gathered at San Luis Potosi. He expressed that he was completely behind continuing the war,. He also expounded upon the peace proposals that had been forwarded to him by the American government. In December the congress elected Santa Anna and Gomez Farias as president and vice-president respectively. Both men had previously won the elections of 1832 in the same fashion. They assumed power on the 24th.   

Gomez Farias now declared that the war would be waged for as long as it took to expel the Americans from all Mexican territory.  

The government struggled to finance the war, a problem made worse by corruption in the finance ministry, which did not inspire confidence when the government proposed an audit of property owners.  On January 7, 1847, a measure was introduced to congress endorsing the seizure of fifteen million pesos from the church by nationalizing and then selling its lands

The legislatures of Queretaro, Puebla, and Guanajuato petitioned congress to nullify the decree. , The State of Durango refused to enforce it, and the State of Queretaro proposed an alternative plan to fund the war effort.  Tenants who lived on church lands were also resistant to the enforcement of the decree.  

The liberal paper El Monitor Republicano was incredulous that amidst all available options for raising funds, the government had chosen to nationalize church lands in the middle of a war, without sounding public opinion, and reminded its readers that the last time Gomez Farias tried to nationalize church lands in 1833 it ended with the overthrow of the government. 

On February 27, 1847, several national guard battalions proclaimed against the government. They released a manifesto excoriating the government for pursuing a divisive policy instead of uniting the country in the war effort and seeking a means of funding the military that was backed by national consensus.  This became known as the Revolt of the Polkos, because the young middle class men who made up the militias stations throughout the capital were known for dancing the polka. 

Meanwhile news arrived that Santa Anna had won the Battle of Buena Vista which took place on February 22 to February 23, 1847, and which in reality had been a draw. Santa was heading back to Mexico City to arrange defenses against the forces of Winfield Scott who had just landed at Veracruz. He was at the town of Matehuala on the way from Angostura to San Luis Potosí City, when he received news that there had been a revolution against the government of Valentin Gomez Farias.  Valentin Gomez Farias resigned. The insurrection ended, troops were sent back to their stations, and the presidency passed over to Santa Anna, but in turn Santa Anna passed the presidency over to Pedro María de Anaya, as he went to face the forces of Winfield Scott. 

Anaya was authorized by congress to place the capital under a state of siege. After the Battle of Cerro Gordo in which the Americans broke through the defenses on the way to Mexico City, congress gave the president extraordinary faculties, without giving him the authority to sign a peace treaty on his own, or to alienate any portion of national territory, and anyone who now attempted to negotiate with the Americans was declared a traitor. On April 2, 1847, Anaya convoked a junta in which he to resolve the issue on whether to defend the capital in case there was not a reasonable chance of winning. All of the supply and budget issues were expounded and the cabinet endorsed guerrilla warfare. When Santa Anna returned to the capital, Anaya passed the presidency down to him. 

Santa Anna was in charge of the presidency as the Americans advanced upon and eventually captured Mexico City. The presidency was eventually transferred back to Anaya, who had commanded forces in the defense of Mexico City. After the loss of the capital the Mexican government fled northeast to the city of Querétaro City. Various governors gathered at Queretaro and suggested various options to the government ranging from a continuation of the war to the surrender of the sparsely populated northern territories.  Per the instructions of Congress, Anaya’s term ended on January 8, 1847, and the presidency passed to  Manuel de la Peña y Peña, who had already served a brief term during the war.

Treaty of Guadalupe Hidalgo

Congress finally met in May, 1847 and at its opening session President Peña y Peña recommended a policy of peace, and ordered the progress that had been made in the fields of order and finances amidst so much challenge. He recounted how as Minister of Foreign Relations under President Herrera, he had been against the war. He did not view this stance as dishonorable as even the most martial of nations at one point had faced a war they could not win. He expressed belief that Mexico simply did not have the ability to continue the war, and proclaimed that anyone who viewed such a stance as dishonorable was not worthy of being called honest. 

The majority of congress supported the government’s peace policy viewing in the Treaty of Guadalupe nothing but the unfortunate result of a poorly fought war, and viewed under this perspective as a national necessity. A foreign relations commission returned affirmative answers to two questions that congress had directed it to report upon: May the government with the consent of Congress cede a portion of territory? Is it suitable to make peace upon the terms which have been proposed? The first question was resolved based upon the principle that congress was the deposit of the national sovereignty. The second question was resolved upon the consideration that Mexico had never been in full possession of the territories that were about to be ceded, and that most of that land was either not populated or populated by hostile indigenous tribes. It was also taken into account that Mexico could not continue the war without facing certain defeat and risking the loss of the entire country. After the commission reported upon its findings, the Treaty of Guadalupe Hidalgo was approved by congress.

As the peace treaty was concluded and the occupiers were on the point of leaving the country, congress named Jose Joaquin Herrera to the presidency of the republic, and Peña y Peña left his post as president  in exchange for the presidency of the Supreme Court on June 3, 1848. The government left Queretaro and returned to the capital.

An Era of Peace and Moderate Rule

Herrera Presidency

On June 14, 1848, President Herrera passed a decree reforming the treasury department, reducing the budget for the civil service and the army, and presented a plan to congress for the consolidation of the national debt.  

On November 30, 1850, the national debt was consolidated into one fund with the interest rate set at 3 percent, that was to receive twenty percent of custom house revenues. A committee was set up to manage the debt and oversee the collection of duties. Forty million pesos of bonds were set to be issued. 

The economic challenge was enormous and while the rest of the Herrera ministry was stable, many financial ministers resigned. However, the economy seemed to be overall improving. Abundant harvests were reported, and the mines began to increase their yields. Construction on a railway and telegraph line was begun, and the first industrial exhibition in Mexico opened on November 1, 1849, in Mexico City.  

On November 4, 1848, the army was reduced to 10,000 men, and conscription was abolished, yet the latter measure had to be abrogated when only enough volunteers could be found to fill half of the men needed in the army.  Another controversial measure was the prohibition of promotion from rank and file troops. The government preferred that officers come from the military schools and from the pool of officers now unemployed due to army reductions. Even the minister of war protested against this measure but it stood.  

The government attempted to establish military colonies along the frontier to settle and pacify the region against Indian raids. The project was hampered by lack of funds, but by 1851, despite not being as extensive as originally planned, reasonable progress on the colonies had nonetheless been made, and three successful settlements were home to over two thousand individuals.  

The 1851 election was won by Mariano Arista, Herrera’s Minister of War, and Herrera was the first Mexican president to complete a full term since the inaugural holder of the office, Guadalupe Victoria has passed power over to Vicente Guerrero in 1828.

Arista Presidency

Arista took office on January 15, 1851. He decided to adopt many of Herrera’s policies, which he as Minister of War had already played a significant hand in enacting, but made some changes in the cabinet 

Mexico’s chronic financial issues remained an imposing issue for the Arista administration. Government income stood at 8 million pesos while expenditure stood at 26 million. A goal was set to reduce the expenditure to 10 million pesos. In order to ameliorate the national finances Arista dramatically cut the salaries of public employees, up to seventy five percent in some cases but the cuts were applies unevenly many unnecessary expenditures remained. Finance Minister Payno resigned over differences on reducing the deficit.

In August, he summoned a council of governors to suggest better remedies. The governors’ response was to attack the administration over its alleged lack of management and presented a new calculation of the national finances which showed no deficit at all. The government gained some slight concessions on budget cuts from congress, but the legislature was largely idle, and received condemnation from the press. Certain journals floated the idea that Arista should dissolve congress only to face arrest. 

Scattered revolts were raised against the government, most prominent of which was the insurrection led by a Guadalajara hatmaker named Blancarte. Supporters of Santa Anna, reached out to Blancarte and successfully convinced the latter to increase the scope of his revolt. On September 13, Blancarte proclaimed that Arista ought to be overthrown and that Santa Anna ought to be recalled to take a role in reorganizing the government.

Fall of the Second Federalist Republic
As the Blancarte revolt spread throughout the entire nation, Arista addressed the chambers on December 15, 1852, and eventually resigned on January 5 As he left the National Palace, he remarked that “This office (of the presidency) and its responsibilities are but a grave burden and a useless title, if they are not accompanies by the power and respect due to them.”

Aftermath
Santa Anna ascended to the presidency for what would turn out to be his last dictatorship. He himself was overthrown in 1855 by the Liberal Plan of Ayutla, inaugurating the era of La Reforma.

References

03
Former territorial entities in North America
Mexico, Second
1840s in Mexico
1850s in Mexico
1860s in Mexico
History of Mexico
Political history of Mexico
1846 establishments in Mexico
1860s disestablishments in Mexico
States and territories established in 1846
States and territories disestablished in 1863
19th century in Mexico
1863 disestablishments in Mexico
Liberalism in Mexico